The Havilah Babcock House is located in Neenah, Wisconsin.

History
The house, designed by William Waters, was built for Havilah Babcock, a co-founder of Kimberly-Clark. It was listed on the National Register of Historic Places in 1974 and on the State Register of Historic Places in 1989.

References

Houses on the National Register of Historic Places in Wisconsin
National Register of Historic Places in Winnebago County, Wisconsin
Houses in Winnebago County, Wisconsin
Stick-Eastlake architecture in the United States
Queen Anne architecture in Wisconsin
Romanesque Revival architecture in Wisconsin
Brick buildings and structures
Houses completed in 1883